Darrell is a given name derived from an English surname, which was derived from Norman-French , originally denoting one who came from Airelle in France. There are no longer any towns  in France called Airelle, but  is the French word for huckleberry.

Darrell may refer to:

Sports 
 Darrell Allums (born 1958), American basketball player
 Darrell Armstrong, NBA basketball player 
 Darrell Campbell, American football defensive tackle on the practice squad of the Chicago Bears
 Darrell Clarke, manager of Bristol Rovers football club
 Darrell Daniels, American football player
 Darrell Evans, former third baseman and first baseman in Major League Baseball
 Darrell Green, cornerback for the Washington Redskins from 1983 to 2002
 Darrell Griffith, former NBA basketball player who spent his entire career with the Utah Jazz
 Darrell Jackson, American football wide receiver currently playing for the Seattle Seahawks of the National Football League
 Darrell Johnson, Major League Baseball catcher and manager
 Darrell Henderson (born 1997), American football player
 Darrell Hogan, American football player
 Darrell May, Major League Baseball pitcher for the Minnesota Twins
 Darrell Porter, Major League Baseball catcher
 Darrell Royal, College Football Hall of Fame member, and is the winningest football coach in University of Texas Longhorn history
 Darrell Russell (dragster driver), NHRA drag racer
 Darrell Russell (American football), two-time Pro Bowl defensive lineman for the Oakland Raid the NFL who died in a car crash
 Darrell Stewart (American football) (born 1996), American football player
 Darrell Taylor (born 1997), American football player
 Darrell Walker (born 1961), American professional basketball coach and retired player
 Darrell Wallace, former Canadian Football League player
 Darrell Wallace Jr., NASCAR driver
 Darrell Waltrip, NASCAR driver and commentator
 Darrell Williams (rugby league), New Zealand rugby league footballer, coach and administrator
 Darrell Williams (basketball) (born 1989), American basketball player for Hapoel Tel Aviv of the Israeli Premier LeaguEstate.    Gemmfkdkg

Arts and entertainment 
 Darrell Banks (1937–1970), American soul singer
 Darrell Eastlake, Australian radio and television presenter 
 Darrell Evans (musician), American Christian musician and songwriter
 Darrell Hammond, American actor and comedian
 Darrell Larson, American actor 
 Timothy Darrell Russ, American actor
 Darrell Scott, American country singer-songwriter 
 Darrell Sheets, American auctioneer and cast member of Storage Wars
 Darrell Sweet (musician), Scottish hard rock drummer
 Darrell K. Sweet, American science fiction and fantasy illustrator
 Darrell Winfield, American rancher and model
 Darrell Zwerling, American actor

Other fields 
 Darrell Blocker, nicknamed "The Spy Whisperer", CIA agent
 Darrell Issa, American politician
 Darrell Long, American computer scientist
 Darrell Keith Rich (1955–2000), Native American serial killer

In fiction
 Darrell Rivers, the protagonist of Enid Blyton series Malory Towers

With the surname
 Dimebag Darrell (1966–2004), American heavy metal guitarist and songwriter
 Johnny Darrell (1940–1997), American country music singer-songwriter
 Norris Darrell, attorney

See also 
 Darrel
 Darel
 Darell
 Darroll
 Daryl
 Darryl
 Durrell
 Derrell

References

English unisex given names
Unisex given names
English-language unisex given names
Surnames